Front Office Appearance is a term typically used in human resources to describe the expected look of workers who are typically the first people encountered by customers (sales, secretaries, customer service) and thus need to make a first good impression on customers. The opposite is NFOA (No Front Office Appearance).

References

Human resource management